The discography of Norwegian DJ Alan Walker consists of two studio albums, six extended plays, 32 singles, 20 remixes and 21 music videos.

Studio albums

Extended plays

Singles

As lead artist

As featured artist

Other songs

Remixes

Record label release

Published remixes

Production credits

Music videos

Notes

References 

Discographies of Norwegian artists
Electronic music discographies
Discography